The Midwest League Most Valuable Player Award (MVP) is an annual award given to the best player in Minor League Baseball's Midwest League based on their regular-season performance as voted on by league managers. League broadcasters, Minor League Baseball executives, and members of the media have previously voted as well. Though the league was established in 1947, the award was not created until 1956.

Twenty-three outfielders have won the MVP Award, the most of any position. First basemen, with 11 winners, have won the most among infielders, followed by third basemen (7), shortstops (4), and second basemen (2). Five catchers and three pitchers have also won the award.

Twenty-four players who have won the MVP Award also won the Midwest League Top MLB Prospect Award (formerly the Prospect of the Year Award) in the same season: Willie Wilson (1975), Paul Molitor (1977), Bill Foley (1978), Dave Stockstill (1979), Von Hayes (1980), Luis Medina (1986), Tom Redington (1989), Reggie Sanders (1990), Salomón Torres (1991), Steve Gibralter (1992), Pablo Ozuna (1998), Albert Pujols (2000), Adrián González (2001), Prince Fielder (2003), Brian Dopirak (2004), Carlos González (2005), Ben Revere (2008), Dee Strange-Gordon (2009), Mike Trout (2010), Rymer Liriano (2011), Byron Buxton (2013), Eloy Jiménez (2016), Bo Bichette (2017), and Andy Pages (2021). From 1956 to 2020, pitchers were eligible to win the MVP Award as no award was designated for pitchers. In 2021, the Midwest League established a Pitcher of the Year Award.

Eight players from the Cedar Rapids Kernels have been selected for the MVP Award, more than any other team in the league, followed by the Beloit Sky Carp, Burlington Bees, Kane County Cougars, Lansing Lugnuts, and Waterloo Indians (4); the Dubuque Packers, Great Lakes Loons, Peoria Chiefs, Springfield Cardinals, and West Michigan Whitecaps (3); the South Bend Cubs (2); and the Clinton Giants, Decatur Commodores, Fort Wayne TinCaps, Kenosha Twins, Kokomo Dodgers, Madison Muskies, Michigan Battle Cats, Midwest Dodgers, Rockford Royals, and Wausau Timbers (1).

Six players from the St. Louis Cardinals Major League Baseball (MLB) organization have won the award, more than any other, followed by the Los Angeles Dodgers and Milwaukee Brewers organizations (5); the Cleveland Guardians, Detroit Tigers, and Minnesota Twins organizations (4); the Chicago Cubs, Cincinnati Reds, San Francisco Giants, and Toronto Blue Jays organizations (2); the Arizona Diamondbacks, Kansas City Royals, Los Angeles Angels, Miami Marlins, and Oakland Athletics organizations (2); and the Atlanta Braves, Chicago White Sox, Houston Astros, Pittsburgh Pirates, and San Diego Padres organizations (1).

Winners

Wins by team

Active Midwest League teams appear in bold.

Wins by organization

Active Midwest League–Major League Baseball affiliations appear in bold.

Notes

References
Specific

General

Awards established in 1956
Minor league baseball trophies and awards
Minor league baseball MVP award winners
MVP